Dinocoroebus is a genus of beetles in the family Buprestidae, containing the following species:

 Dinocoroebus pertusicollis (Fairmaire, 1897)
 Dinocoroebus ugandae (Obenberger, 1922)

References

Buprestidae genera